Subwave may refer to:

Subwave in Elliot wave theory
Subwavelength
Ultrawave in science fiction 
Subwave (band), German band